El Eco Obrero ('The Workers Echo') was a fortnightly workers newspaper published from Sucre, Bolivia 1916–1917. It carried the by-line "Organ of the working class".

The newspaper was founded by two workers, Miguel Navarro and Miguel Santos Sea. The newspaper was printed at Imprenta de la Industria. El Eco Obrero advocated unity in action between capitalists and workers.

References

Publications established in 1916
Publications disestablished in 1917
Spanish-language newspapers
Newspapers published in Bolivia
Defunct newspapers published in Venezuela
Biweekly newspapers